This is a list of members of the Australian Senate between 1 July 2008 and 30 June 2011. Half of the state senators had been elected at the November 2007 election and had terms due to finish on 30 June 2014; the other half of the state senators were elected at the October 2004 election and had terms due to finish on 30 June 2011. The territory senators were elected at the November 2007 election and their terms ended at the next federal election, which was August 2010. The new Senate first met in August 2008, with state senators elected in 2007 sworn in on 26 August 2008.

Assuming party discipline, the Gillard Labor government needed the support of either the Coalition, or of all the other non-Coalition senators to pass legislation.

Notes

References

Members of Australian parliaments by term
21st-century Australian politicians
Australian Senate lists